This is a list of administrators and governors of Edo State, Nigeria, which was formed on 27 August 1991 when the former Bendel State was divided into Edo State and Delta State.

See also
List of Governors of Abia State
States of Nigeria
List of state governors of Nigeria

References

Edo
Main